Kumbakonam M. Rajappa Iyer was a Mridangam Vidwan in the field of Carnatic music from India. He was born in 1916 at Kumbakonam to Muthuswamy Iyer and Sitalakshmi Ammal.

Early life
Rajappa Iyer underwent "Gurukulavasam" under Kumbakonam Alaga Nambi Pillai.
After the demise of Pillai, Rajappa Iyer pursued a Mridangam education with Sakkottai Rangu Iyengar.

Career
Rajappa Iyer accompanied on Mridangam and Ghatam for stalwarts like Ariyakudi, Sivan, T. K. Rangachari, M. D. Ramanathan, Dr. Balamurali Krishna, Chittibabu, Lalgudi G Jayaraman, Ramani and many others apart from giving many lec-dems on mridangam and ghatam playing techniques. Rajappa Iyer formulated unique style of teaching in which the lessons were systematically arranged with focus on fingering techniques. His style of Carnatic music is known as the "Rajappa Iyer School".

Awards
Rajappa Iyer received many titles and honours:
 Layavadya Kovidha
 Nadha Kanal
 Mridanga Laya Mani
 Sangeetha Seva Niratha
 DKJ Memorial award
 TTK Memorial award
 Sangeetha Kala Acharya from Music Academy (2001)
 Asthana Vidwan - Kanchi Kamakoti Peetam

Layodaya celebrated the Birth Centenary Celebrations of Rajappa Iyer on 6–8 October 2016 at Vani Mahal.

Disciples 
Rajappa Iyer has taught many popular Mridangam players. His disciples include well known professional artistes on the mridangam and ghatam: K R Ganesh (Son), Srimushnam Raja Rao,Papanasam R Kumar, S R Jayaraman, V Sundaraghavan, K Ramakrishnan, Balashankar, Vilangudi V.Sivakumar, Venkataraman (Pune), Umayalpuram Mali, Umayalpuram V. Kalyanaraman, Palani Kumar, B. Ganapathiraman, Vijay Siva, Manoj Siva, Shriram Brahmanandham, V Kalyanaraman, Chrompet J Ganesh, Vijayaganesh, V Srinivasan, Madipakkam Murali, Adambakkam Shankar, Kalakkadu Srinivasan and Chromepet Suresh, Suryanarayanan, Komal R Srinivas.

References

2007 deaths
1916 births
Indian percussionists
Mridangam players
20th-century Indian musicians